There is one Kasi in the entire world and many Dakshina Kashi's. However one temple in Northern Telangana resembles exactly like Kasi. It is called as Chennur located in Mancherial dist. Unlike all other rivers flowing South-East, There Godavari River flows towards North for 15 Kilometers similar to Ganges River flowing north in Kasi. Due to this, River stream here is also called as PanchaKrosha UttaraVahini by locals. There is also very old ancient temple of Lord shiva. It is known as Amba Agasteshwara temple. It is believed that Saint Agastya lived here once and built the linga idol in Dwapara Yuga. After that,in 12AD, Kakatiya Dynasty kings PratapaRudra Rebuilt and developed the temple. The temple also withstood attacks in 1600's by Mughal Empire in the past. People bath in holy Godavari River and offer prayers at the temple. There are lot of other temples in nearby Chennur region with rich cultural heritage.

Other newest members by Myth are highlighted below.

 Shivagange
 Siddhavattam, Cuddapah
 Draksharamam
 Kanchipuram
 Srikanteshwara Temple
 Sree Mahadeva Temple, Kandiyoor
 Viswanatha Swamy Temple, Palakkad
 Basaveshwara temple, Kuruvathi
 Jogulamba Temple, Alampur
 Oachira Temple, Oachira
 Gavi Gangadhareshwara Temple, Bangalore
 Trikkannad Shiva Temple, Kasaragod
 Kalakaleshwara temple, Gajendragad
 Uppinangadi
 Harihareshwara Temple, Harihar
 Terumalleshwara Temple, Hiriyur

References

Dakshina Kasis